Klein Bünzow is a municipality in the Vorpommern-Greifswald district, in Mecklenburg-Vorpommern, Germany.

Transport
Klein Bünzow railway station connects the area with Stralsund, Greifswald, Züssow, Angermünde, Eberswalde and Berlin.

People 
 Eduard von Below (1856-1942), German general

References

Vorpommern-Greifswald